The Gaunless is a tributary river of the Wear in County Durham, England. Its name is Old Norse, meaning "useless". The Gaunless Viaduct, built in 1825, was the tallest viaduct on the South Durham & Lancashire Union Railway.

Formed just south of the village of Copley, by the confluence of Arn Gill (to the south, coming west from south of Langleydale Common) and Hindon Beck (to the north and coming east from Langleydale Common), the Gaunless wends its way east, passing the settlements of Butterknowle, Cockfield and Evenwood and through West Auckland before skirting the south and east of Bishop Auckland on its way to meet the River Wear.

An extension of the Copley Met.Office weather station has been placed at the head of the river at Copley Lead Mill to study its unique climate of frost and snow. It lies in a frost hollow and receives no sunshine between October and March because of its geography.

Settlements
 Copley
 Butterknowle
 Evenwood
 West Auckland
 Bishop Auckland

Tributaries
 Arn Gill
 Hindon Beck
 Cowclose Beck
 Foul Sike
 Grewburn Beck
 Howle Beck
 Gordon Beck
 Norton Fine Beck
 Oakley Cross Beck
 Hummer Beck
 Dene Beck
 Coundon Burn

Bridges 
 Gaunless Bridge
 Gaunless Viaduct
 Swin Bridge

References

External links

 
Gaunless